The Middlesboro Downtown Commercial District in Middlesboro, Kentucky is a  historic district which was listed on the National Register of Historic Places in 1983.

It is roughly bounded by Cumberland Ave., 19th Street, 20th Street, and Edgewood Road.  It included 61 contributing buildings, including a post office.

It includes the original downtown core.

Contributing buildings include:
Old City Hall
the Coal House, "now the Chamber of Commerce, which is built entirely of coal"(!)
the United States Post Office (1915), Classical Revival in style
the old Carnegie Library, a one-story classical masonry structure
the First Presbyterian Church, built in 1889 and expanded in 1912.

References

Historic districts on the National Register of Historic Places in Kentucky
National Register of Historic Places in Bell County, Kentucky
Late 19th and Early 20th Century American Movements architecture
Middlesboro, Kentucky